Saman Sarabi (born November 17, 1976 in Tehran) is an Iranian IFBB professional bodybuilder. His father is Sohrab Sarabi an Iranian athlete in the field of bodybuilding. In 70 kg weight he was a List of World Amateur Bodybuilding Championships medalists.

Authorities:

st Asian Champion 2001 South Korea Pusan.

First Asian Champion 2003 Kazakhstan Almaty.

Third World Champion 2005 China Shanghai.

Fourth Bodybuilding at the 2006 Asian Games – Men's 70 kg.

References

External links
 http://www.chinadaily.com.cn/sports/2006-12/09/content_754507_2.htm
 http://www.arabmuscle.net/Iran/Iran%20frame.htm
 http://www.chinaethnicgroups.com/photo/2006-12/09/content_754505.htm
 http://www.aftabir.com/news/view/2005/nov/27/c6c1133112513_sport_other_sport.php
 http://musclememory.com/show.php?a=Sarabi,+Sohrab

1976 births
Iranian bodybuilders
Living people
Bodybuilders at the 2006 Asian Games